People awarded the Honorary citizenship of the City of Tel Aviv, Israel are:

Honorary Citizens of Tel Aviv
Listed by year of award:

References

Tel Aviv
Tel Aviv
Honorary citizens